Pontibacter litorisediminis  is a Gram-negative, aerobic and motile bacterium from the genus of Pontibacter which has been isolated from tidal flat sediments from the Yellow Sea in Korea.

References

External links
Type strain of Pontibacter litorisediminis at BacDive -  the Bacterial Diversity Metadatabase

Cytophagia
Bacteria described in 2016